In quantum mechanics, the total angular momentum quantum number parametrises the total angular momentum of a given particle, by combining its orbital angular momentum and its intrinsic angular momentum (i.e., its spin).

If s is the particle's spin angular momentum and ℓ its orbital angular momentum vector, the total angular momentum j is

The associated quantum number is the main total angular momentum quantum number j. It can take the following range of values, jumping only in integer steps:

where ℓ is the azimuthal quantum number (parameterizing the orbital angular momentum) and s is the spin quantum number (parameterizing the spin).

The relation between the total angular momentum vector j and the total angular momentum quantum number j is given by the usual relation (see angular momentum quantum number)

The vector's z-projection is given by

It ranges from −j to +j in steps of one. This generates 2j + 1 different values of mj.

The total angular momentum corresponds to the Casimir invariant of the Lie algebra so(3) of the three-dimensional rotation group.

See also
 
 Principal quantum number
 Orbital angular momentum quantum number
 Magnetic quantum number
 Spin quantum number
 Angular momentum coupling
 Clebsch–Gordan coefficients
 Angular momentum diagrams (quantum mechanics)
 Rotational spectroscopy

References

Albert Messiah, (1966). Quantum Mechanics (Vols. I & II), English translation from French by G. M. Temmer. North Holland, John Wiley & Sons.

External links
 Vector model of angular momentum
 LS and jj coupling

Angular momentum
Atomic physics
Quantum numbers
Rotation in three dimensions
Rotational symmetry